The autonomous regions are the highest-level administrative divisions of China. Like Chinese provinces, an autonomous region has its own local government, but under Chinese law, an autonomous region has more legislative rights, such as the right to "formulate self-government regulations and other separate regulations." An autonomous region is the highest level of minority autonomous entity in China, which has a comparably higher population of a particular minority ethnic group. 

The autonomous regions are the creations of the People's Republic of China (PRC), as they are not recognized by the Republic of China (ROC) based in Taiwan, which previously ruled Mainland China before the PRC's establishment in 1949.

History
Established in 1947, the Inner Mongolia Autonomous Region became the first autonomous region in the Chinese liberated zone. Xinjiang was made autonomous in 1955 after the PRC's founding, and Guangxi and Ningxia were made autonomous in 1958. Tibet was annexed by the People's Republic of China in 1951, and was declared an autonomous Autonomous Region in 1965. The designation of Guangxi and Ningxia as Zhuang and Hui autonomous areas, respectively, was bitterly protested by the local Han Chinese, who made up two-thirds of the population of each region. Although Mongols made up an even smaller percentage of Inner Mongolia than either of these, the ensuing Chinese Civil War gave little opportunity for protest.

Legal rights
Autonomous regions in China have no legal right to secede, unlike in the Soviet Union – the Law of the People's Republic of China on Regional Ethnic Autonomy, written in 1984, states that "each and every ethnic autonomous region is an inseparable part of the People's Republic of China," and that "any form of... separatism... is absolutely prohibited."

List of autonomous regions

Statistics

Population

Ethnic 

Note: In the "Third Largest Ethnic Group" column is the ethnic group given in brackets, after the names of the autonomous regions and Han people.

See also 

 Administrative divisions of China
 Autonomous prefecture
 Direct-administered municipalities of China
 Provinces of China
 Special administrative regions of China
 Autonomous administrative division
 Language Atlas of China
 Secession in China
 Standard Chinese
 Republics of Russia

References

External links 

 Regional Autonomy for Ethnic Minorities in China

 
R
Province-level divisions of China